Eburia baroni is a species of beetle in the family Cerambycidae that is endemic to Mexico.

References

baroni
Beetles described in 1892
Endemic insects of Mexico
Beetles of South America